is a Japanese actress and model.

Biography
Yamamoto was born in Fukuoka Prefecture. She started her career as an exclusive model for the women's fashion magazine CanCam in 2009. Two years later, she made her acting debut in the Fuji TV drama Shiawase ni Narōyo.

She also appears in various television commercials. In 2011, she was chosen as the image character for Samantha Thavasa. On August 11, 2012, she made her film debut playing Kirishima's girlfriend in The Kirishima Thing. From 2012 to 2014, she hosted the NTV's variety show Woman on the Planet.

In 2014, she graduated from Meiji University where she studied life science.

On 7 August 2020, Yamamoto married her costar in TV dramas Hope: Kitai Zero no Shinnyu Shain and Perfect World, Kōji Seto.

Appearances

TV dramas

 Shiawase ni Narōyo Episode 6-7 (Fuji TV, 2011), Emi Kirishima
 The Quiz (NTV, 2012), Hitomi Arisato
 Doctor X: Gekai Daimon Michiko (TV Asahi, 2012), Rie Koike
 Piece – Kanojo no Kioku Episode 10-11 (NTV, 2012), Kumi
 Summer Nude (Fuji TV, 2013), Aoi Horikiri
 Andō Lloyd: A.I. knows Love? (TBS, 2013), Kaoru Kuriyama
 Boku no Ita Jikan (Fuji TV, 2014), Hina Murayama
 Aoi Honō (TV Tokyo, 2014), Tonko Morinaga
 Oyaji no Senaka Episode 2 (TBS, 2014), Arisa Takajō
 Hell Teacher Nūbē (NTV, 2014), Izuna Hazuki
 64 (NHK, 2015), Shiori Mikumo
 Koinaka (Fuji TV, 2015), Mirei Tominaga
 Rinshō Hanzai Gakusha Himura Hideo no Suiri (NTV, 2016), Akemi Kijima
Hope: Kitai Zero no Shinnyu Shain (Fuji TV, 2016), Akane Katsuki
 Uso no Sensou (Fuji TV, 2017), Kaede Nishina
Detective Yugami (Fuji TV, 2017), Hizumi
The Midnight Supercar (NHK, 2018), Shirayuki
The Count of Monte-Cristo: Great Revenge (Fuji TV, 2018), Sumire Meguro
Kono Manga ga Sugoi! (TV Tokyo, 2018), Utena Tenjou
Idaten (NHK, 2019), Honjō
Les Misérables: Owarinaki Tabiji (Fuji TV, 2019), Yui Fuwa
The Lone Scalpel (WOWOW, 2019), Shoko Okawa
Perfect World (Fuji TV, 2019), Tsugumi Kawana

Films
 The Kirishima Thing (2012), Risa Īda
 Zekkyō Gakkyū (2013), Yomi
 Daily Lives of High School Boys (2013), Yanagin
 Hunter × Hunter: The Last Mission (2013), Rengoku
 Black Butler (2014), Rin
 Tokyo Nanmin (2014), Rui Kawabe
 Jossy's (2014), Sumire Konno/Navy
 Close Range Love (2014), Kikuko Nanami
 Onodera no Otouto, Onodera no Ane (2014), Kaoru Okano
 Pikachu to Pokémon Ongakutai (2015), narrator
 Tokyo PR Woman (2015), Rena Misaki I am a Monk (2015), Kyoko Ochi
 Sadako vs. Kayako (2016), Yūri Kurahashi/Sadakaya
 Night's Tightrope (2016), Atsuko Kusano
 Peach Girl (2017), Momo Adachi
 Last Winter, We Parted (2018), Yuriko Matsuda
 My Friend "A" (2018), Kiyomi Sugimoto
Hugtto! Pretty Cure Futari wa Pretty Cure: All Stars Memories (2018), Reporter (voice)
 The Fable (2019), Misaki
 Threads: Our Tapestry of Love (2020), Reiko Takagi
 The Untold Tale of the Three Kingdoms (2020), Younger Qiao
 The Fable: The Killer Who Doesn't Kill (2021), Misaki
 Immersion (2023), Tamaki Sonoda

Web dramasKyō Kara Hitman (dTV, 2014), ChinatsuUchū no Shigoto (Amazon prime, 2016), Alien SomiaruTokyo Alice (Amazon prime, 2017), Fuu ArisugawaGintama 2: Yonimo Kimyou na Gintama-chan (dTV, 2018), Maetel星 から 来 た あなた My Love from the Stars (Amazon Original, KyodoTV 2022)

Stage
 Kaidan Nise Sara Yashiki (Aoyama Theatre, 19 June 2014 – 23 June 2014) as Okiku

Music videos
 Moumoon - Yey (2010) with Aiku Maikawa, Mew Azama, Hazuki Tsuchiya
 Cliff Edge - Endless Tears feat. Maiko Nakamura (2011)
 Nerdhead - Tomorrow feat. Hiroko from Mihimaru GT (2012)
 Back Number - Watagashi (2012)

Bibliography
 Photobooks 

 Mizuki (Takarajimasha, 15 December 2018), 

 Calendars 2015 Mizuki Yamamoto Calendar (Shogakukan, 21 November 2014) 2016 Mizuki Yamamoto Calendar (Shogakukan, 21 November 2015) 

 Magazines CanCam'', Shogakukan 1982-, as an exclusive model from December 2009 to September 2017

Awards
 1st Tokyo Supermodel Contest (2009): Won

References

External links

  
 
Mizuki Yamamoto on Instagram

1991 births
Living people
21st-century Japanese actresses
Japanese film actresses
Japanese television actresses
Japanese female models
People from Fukuoka
Meiji University alumni